Shuiximen is a subdistrict and the seat of Wugang City in Hunan, China. It was one of four subdistricts approved to establish in 1994 and officially created in 2011. The subdistrict of Shuiximen  has 14 villages and 5 communities under its jurisdiction. Its seat is Desheg Village.

History
The subdistrict of Shuiximen was approved to establish from a part of the former Chengguan Town, Qingfeng Village of Chengdong Township and two villages of Futian and Xinguang of Chengxi Township in 1994.

Amalgamation of villages in 2016

Subdivisions
Through the amalgamation of villages in 2016, the number of villages was reduced to 14 from 21, the subdistrict of Shuiximen has 5 communities and 14 villages under its jurisdiction.

14 villages
 Desheng Village
 Futian Village
 Jiandao Village
 Liren Village
 Longtian Village
 Luowei Village
 Ma'an Village
 Shuitai Village
 Tangling Village
 Taohua Village
 Wanquan Village
 Xinguang Village
 Xinhe Village
 Yuping Village

5 communities
 Dapaotai Community
 Puling Community
 Shuiximen Community
 Taokan Community
 Zhushan Community

Subdivisions in 2015
In 2015, Longtian Township() was merged to the subdistrict of Shuiximen, the new subdistrict of Shuiximen had 21 villages and 5 communities under it jurisdiction, of which, 5 communities and 3 villages from the former Shuiximen Subdistrict and 18 villages from Longtian Township.

18 villages from the formertownship of Longtian
 Baojia Village
 Changling Village
 Changtang Village
 Desheng Village
 Jiandao Village
 Liren Village
 Longjing Village
 Longtian Village
 Luosheng Village
 Ma'an Village
 Shixiang Village
 Taiping Village
 Taohua Village
 Wanquan Village
 Xi'an Village
 Xinhe Village
 Yongxiang Village
 Yuping Village

3 villages and 5 communities from the former subdistrict of Shuiximen
 Futian Village
 Qingfeng Village
 Xinguang Village
 Dapaotai Community
 Puling Community
 Shuixmen Community
 Taokan Community
 Zhushan Community

References

External links
 Official website

Wugang, Hunan
Subdistricts of Hunan